Garland Edward Allen III (born February 13, 1936) is an American historian and biographer at Washington University in St. Louis. His research interests lie primarily in the history of genetics, eugenics and evolution.

Life
Allen was born on February 13, 1936, in Louisville, Kentucky. He graduated from the University of Louisville in 1957. He completed his PhD in the history of science at Harvard University in 1966 under the direction of Ernst Mayr and Everett Mendelsohn after spending a few years as a high school biology teacher. He has taught at Washington University and has held several visiting professorships at Harvard.

Thomas Hunt Morgan
To date, Allen has offered the fullest treatment of the life and work of Thomas Hunt Morgan, himself a Kentucky native. Allen's extensive review of Morgan presents the story of an experimentalist who staunchly avoided open political ties to science for fear of biasing the research. His discussion of the fly room, first at Columbia, then at Caltech, suggests that the collaborative environment within which Morgan worked with his students, H.J. Muller, Alfred Sturtevant, Calvin Bridges, and Theodosius Dobzhansky played an important role in establishing Drosophila melanogaster as a model organism for genetics, and launching the careers of these titans of 20th century genetics. Allen's work contributes to the body of history chronicling the emergence of American science.

Eugenics
Allen is an international leader on the history of eugenics. His work suggests that eugenics movements were not merely localized to Germany, Britain and America, but rather that eugenics constituted an international ideological shift from social Darwinism, whereby nature would weed out people with poor heredity, to an ideology where humanity must control its own genetic stock. He has suggested that with the unveiling of the human genome, we should be cautious of a new wave of the eugenics movement.

Works
 Matter, Energy, and Life (4 Editions)
 Life Sciences in the 20th Century (1975)
 Thomas Hunt Morgan: The Man and his Science (1978)
 Biology: Scientific Process and Social Issues (2002)

Accolades
 2011: Fellow of American Association for the Advancement of Science
 Trustee and Chairman of the history committee at the Marine Biological Laboratory
 President of the International Society for the History, Philosophy and Social Studies of Biology
 2017: George Sarton Medal AAAS

References 

American biographers
American male biographers
Living people
Washington University in St. Louis faculty
Harvard Graduate School of Arts and Sciences alumni
University of Louisville alumni
21st-century American historians
21st-century American male writers
1936 births
Writers from Louisville, Kentucky
Fellows of the American Association for the Advancement of Science
American male non-fiction writers